Tidaholm Municipality (Tidaholms kommun) is a municipality in Västra Götaland County in western Sweden. Its seat is located in the city of Tidaholm.

The municipality is located on the banks of the river Tidan.

In the early 1970s a nationwide local government reform was carried out in Sweden. Urban and rural areas were merged into larger unitary municipalities. The former City of Tidaholm (instituted in 1910) was in 1974 amalgamated with the surrounding rural municipality Hökensås and parts of Dimbo and Fröjered. The number of original entities (as of 1863) within the present municipality is 20.

Many well-preserved medieval churches stand in the municipality. Some church sites also contain examples of early Scandinavian runestones.

References

External links

Tidaholm Municipality - Official site

Municipalities of Västra Götaland County
Skaraborg